Black Hawk is an unincorporated community in Caldwell and Trigg counties, Kentucky, United States.

References

Unincorporated communities in Caldwell County, Kentucky
Unincorporated communities in Trigg County, Kentucky
Unincorporated communities in Kentucky